Wesly is a given name. Notable people with the name include:

Wesly Decas (born 1999), Honduran footballer
Wesly Felix (born 1947), Haitian boxer
Wesly Mallard (born 1978), American football player

See also
Wesley (disambiguation)